Lena Burrell Prewitt (born February 1931) was the first African American female professor to be appointed at the University of Alabama. Originally from Tuscaloosa, Alabama, Pruitt earned her master’s degree in 1955 and her EdD in 1961. She is notable for working with Wernher von Braun at NASA on the Saturn V project.

Academic work
After her time with NASA, Prewitt focused on her primary interest of teaching. She was teaching at Florence State College when she and her husband, Moses Kennedy Prewitt, left to accept positions at the University of Alabama in 1970, in what is now known as the Culverhouse College of Business. Additionally, Prewitt held various teaching and administrative positions at Stillman College, her alma mater. She is currently retired.

References

African-American women academics
American women academics
African-American academics
People from Tuscaloosa, Alabama
University of Alabama faculty
Stillman College faculty
Stillman College alumni
1931 births
Possibly living people